Mendel Osherowitch (January 14, 1888 – April 16, 1965) was a Podilia-born American Yiddish journalist, novelist, historian, and translator. He wrote for The Forward from 1914 to 1965, and he authored many books, including three novels and a book about Yiddish theatre. His book on the Holodomor was first translated into English posthumously in 2020.  A recent review of his book How People Live in Soviet Russia: Impressions from a Journey prepared by the Jewish Review of Books is available at https://jewishreviewofbooks.com/articles/9902/bread-and-vodka/

References

1888 births
1965 deaths
Journalists from New York City
Novelists from New York (state)
Emigrants from the Russian Empire to the United States
Yiddish-language journalists